Coralee Ella Oakes (born 1972) is a Canadian politician, who was elected to the Legislative Assembly of British Columbia in the 2013 provincial election. She represents the electoral district of Cariboo North as a member of the British Columbia Liberal Party. Oakes served in Cabinet appointed as Minister of Community, Sport and Cultural Development, and then Minister of Small Business and Red Tape Reduction, and Minister Responsible for the Liquor Distribution Branch. 

Oakes is a former two-term Quesnel city councillor and executive director of the Quesnel and District Chamber of Commerce since 1999. As a result of her community work, in 2007 Oakes was appointed by the province to the Small Business Roundtable to represent the rural voice of small business. This work led her to be appointed to the Minister's Council on Tourism in 2009. Oakes is the past president of the British Columbia Chamber Executives and has served as a director on the BC Chamber of Commerce, Canadian Chamber of Commerce Executives, Cariboo Chilcotin Tourism Association and numerous local not-for-profit organizations.

Electoral record

References

British Columbia Liberal Party MLAs
Women government ministers of Canada
Members of the Executive Council of British Columbia
Women MLAs in British Columbia
Living people
1972 births
21st-century Canadian politicians
21st-century Canadian women politicians